The Skunks were a third wave ska band formed in 1988 by a group of high school friends from suburban Maryland. They recorded three albums, performed extensively in the Washington, DC/Baltimore, Maryland area, and toured the United States.

History

Founding
In August 1988, Matt Earl and James McDonald, who had been members of Boy Scout Troop 214 in University Park, Maryland, encountered Joe Hottel and Erick Morgan at a skateboarding hangout in Riverdale Park, Maryland. From this association, came the idea of starting The Skunks.  Soon, the newly formed band, augmented by Anthony Foronda, Jake Hughes and Brent Washburn, began to play at events and parties in suburban Maryland. In December 1988, the Skunks performed their first paid show at DC Space in Washington. This was followed, in April 1989, by a show on the University of Maryland campus in College Park, Maryland, and in September, by a performance at the 9:30 Club. These were the first of their many appearances at these venues.

Soon, the increasing popularity of the Skunks led them to recruit Tony Albano, Andy Hayleck, Reggie Romain, Dave Rudolph, Dave Smallwood and Scott Treude. To enhance their appeal to commercial venues, the Skunks created a cassette, which was copyrighted on September 29, 1990, but never released. However, James Joyce, an archivist of underground music, singled out this tape as one of his "most prized recordings".

Chaos In Skaville
The demo tape was followed by a cassette, Chaos in Skaville. It was copyrighted on May 5, 1991, and released by PU Records, which was a company created by the Skunks. It also released a 7 inch vinyl single, "Piñata", in 1992. After these releases, the band's schedule became more active, with many shows in local venues and occasional performances on the road. In 1992, during an appearance at Hennessey's bar in Georgetown, the Skunks invited The Pietasters to perform with them. This was the first of many occasions when the two bands played together. They also shared a record label.

Moon Ska Records
Even before Chaos in Skaville, the Skunks had attracted the attention of Robert "Bucket" Hingley, who was recruiting for his label Moon Ska Records. To confirm his interest, Hingley invited them to go on tour with his band The Toasters. During the summer of 1992, The Skunks performed with Hingley's band, as well as several other ska acts, at the Masquerade in Atlanta, Georgia, Augusta, Georgia, Wilmington, North Carolina, Madison, Wisconsin, Milwaukee, Wisconsin, and Chicago, Illinois. The tour culminated, on February 27, 1993, with Moon Ska's Skalapalooza at The Ritz in New York City, where The Skunks appeared with The Toasters, Bad Manners, The Skatalites, The Scofflaws, and Ruder Than You. After the tour, the Skunks signed with Moon Ska and shortly thereafter, Chaos in Skaville appeared in Moon's catalog, where it was listed as MR034.

Mixed Nuts
During 1993, the Skunks, joined by new members George Beronio, Tim Karns and Mike Kim, continued to perform at home and on tour. In April, they participated, with The Pietasters, in the SkaOiAndPunk festival at the Masquerade. That summer, during their "Nuts on the Beach" tour, they performed at Dick's Clam and Cow in Virginia Beach, Virginia, as well as at several other locations in the Tidewater region of Virginia.

During breaks, the Skunks recorded tracks for a new album, Mixed Nuts. When it was almost ready, Joe Hottel decided to move to Atlanta.  Consequently, on the final version, he was replaced by new vocalist, Steve Orders. However, lyrics on all tracks but one were written by Hottel.

At the Black Cat, the release of Mixed Nuts was celebrated on August 18, 1994, and in June 1995, it appeared in the Moon Ska catalog as MR040. Even before Moon's official release of Mixed Nuts, one of its tracks, "Big Haired Girls", appeared in the compilation Skarmageddon (Moon Ska 1994). Two more tracks are included in compilations: "Odd Couple" is on Cover to Cover [Ska] (Bob Media 1996), and "YMCA" is on Skandalous: I've Gotcha Covered, Vol. 2 (Shanachie Records 1997).

In 1994 and 1995, The Skunks continued to perform and tour. During a nationwide tour to California and back, they performed with Mustard Plug in Lawrence, Kansas, and St. Louis, Missouri.

No Apologies
In 1995, after Mixed Nuts was released, James McDonald left The Skunks to found a new band, Eastern Standard Time. As the Skunks began work on another album, Larry Schugam took over drums, Dave Reinstein replaced Dave Rudolph on trombone, and Rico Renzi took bass. During the summer of 1996, in anticipation of the new release, the Skunks toured Quebec and five U.S. states. This tour ended in New York City, where they appeared with Spring Heeled Jack. On August 24, 1996, the album  No Apologies was released as Moon Ska MR079. One of its tracks, "Dubz 57 Sauce", was included on the Moon Ska produced soundtrack to the 1997 independent film, Bang. In the summer of 1997, the band broke up. In his review of No Apologies, Brian Ellis expressed his appreciation of The Skunks.

Where are they now?
As they got older and the band wound down, several members moved on to other bands. Erick Morgan, Dave Reinstein, Ely Rodriguez and Matt Simms joined Eastern Standard Time. Morgan also joined Lickity Split and the Pietasters, before forming The Spice Boyz with Chris Suspect. Similarly, before joining The Toasters, Tim Karns played with the Checkered Cabs. Morgan died of cardiac complications brought on by pneumonia on April 18, 2020.

Joe Hottell lives in the Atlanta suburb Decatur, Georgia, where he performs occasionally and plays soccer with the Oakhurst Rovers.

Steve Orders taught English at Earle B. Wood Middle School and Thomas Sprigg Wootton High School in Rockville, Maryland.

Scott Treude has played with several bands, including Fireworks Go Up!, while pursuing parallel careers as an environmental physicist and web programmer.

Dave Rudolph, Mike Kim and Ely Rodriguez now live in California.

Matt Earl, who left The Skunks to go to graduate school, is Associate Professor in the Department of Radiation Oncology at the University of Maryland, Baltimore, where he is director of the dosimetry training program. He works in the Tate Cancer Center at Baltimore Washington Medical Center.

Andy Hayleck has created "sound films", and other experimental music, which he has performed with the group Trockeneis. He serves on the faculty of Maryland Institute College of Art in Baltimore.

Rico Renzi is an artist. He is the colorist and a co-creator of the version of Spider-Woman, colloquially referred to as Spider-Gwen.

Personnel

Timeline

References

Third-wave ska groups
Musical groups established in 1988
American ska musical groups
Musical groups from Washington, D.C.
Musical groups disestablished in 1997